San Marino nationality law is contained in the provisions of the Law on Citizenship (2000) which was amended in 2004 and 2016 and in the relevant provisions of the San Marino Constitution. A person may be a citizen of San Marino through birth, descent or through naturalisation.

Acquisition of citizenship

At birth

Any child born within the territory of San Marino is automatically a citizen of San Marino if both parents were citizens of San Marino. In the case of only one parent being a citizen of San Marino, 12 months after the child turns 18, both of the parents must declare that the child wishes to choose the citizenship of the parent that is a citizen of San Marino.

Citizenship by birth can also happen if:

The parents of the child born in San Marino are stateless. 
The child is found abandoned where both parents are unknown.

By descent

Any child born outside of San Marino has a claim to citizenship if at least one of his/her parents are a citizen of San Marino.  

The children of all San Marino citizens of 18 years of age, who permanently reside within the territory of San Marino for a minimum of 10 years, are eligible for citizenship.

By naturalisation

Anyone with a valid residence permit who has lived in San Marino for 30 years can apply for naturalisation through the Grand and General Council provided they:

Renounce their previous citizenship, as San Marino does not recognize dual citizenship.
Have never been convicted of a criminal offence in San Marino or abroad.
Have never received a prison sentence of more than 1 year.

Loss of citizenship

Voluntary

Voluntary renunciation of San Marino Citizenship is allowed under law provided it doesn’t render the person stateless.

Involuntary

San Marino citizenship is presumed to be lost when someone acquires foreign citizenship. 

People who became citizens of San Marino through naturalisation may have their citizenship revoked if it was obtained by fraud, false representation or the concealment of any material fact.

Dual citizenship

San Marino does not recognise dual citizenship and any citizen who obtains foreign citizenship loses their San Marino citizenship.

Travel freedom of Sammarinese citizens

References

Law of San Marino
Nationality law